Lüdemann is a surname of:

 Gerd Lüdemann (1946–2021), German New Testament scholar
 Hans Lüdemann (died 1913), German sailor
 Hermann Lüdemann (1880–1959), German politician
 Mirco Lüdemann (born 1973), German professional ice hockey player

See also
 German destroyer Z18 Hans Lüdemann

Surnames from given names